Brush Creek is a  tributary of Wills Creek in Pennsylvania in the United States.

Brush Creek drains a piece of the Allegheny Plateau in eastern Somerset County. It flows through Northampton Township and enters Wills Creek in Fairhope Township, just above the Railroad Cut Falls at Fairhope.

See also
List of rivers of Pennsylvania

References

Rivers of Somerset County, Pennsylvania
Tributaries of the Potomac River
Allegheny Plateau
Rivers of Pennsylvania